Spirit Mountain is a ski area in Duluth, Minnesota. It was founded by the City of Duluth and was built in 1974. Between 2014 and 2020, the executive director was Brandy Ream.

The Spirit Mountain ski area held its grand opening on December 19–20, 1974. The idea was proposed by former Olympian George Hovland, who laid out the cross country trails, with support from then Mayor of Duluth Ben Boo. Local businessman Manley Goldfine served as Chairman of the Spirit Mountain Authority during its development. It greatly increased winter revenues in the city. The extension of Interstate 35 stretching to Duluth was a major contributor to its initial success. 

Spirit Mountain is known for having a large terrain park.

In the 21st century, Spirit Mountain has been renovating and adding to its infrastructure and attractions. An alpine coaster opened in 2010.  In April 2011 they announced plans to add a zip line, miniature golf, and snow tubing to expand operations and attract more visitors in summer. In 2012 the hill's first high-speed chairlift, the Spirit Express II, opened, and work began on downhill mountain bike trails during the following summer. A chalet on Grand Avenue at the bottom of the slope opened in 2013 and serves as the starting point for the Grand Avenue Nordic Center, which opened 2.5km of Nordic ski trails in 2018. Additional improvements planned over the next ten years include chalet renovations, chair lift replacements.

References

External links
 Spirit Mountain

Sports in Duluth, Minnesota
Duluth–Superior metropolitan area
Ski areas and resorts in Minnesota
Tourist attractions in Duluth, Minnesota